Archipsocus is a genus of bark lice in the insect family Archipsocidae. Members of this genus are found in tropical and subtropical regions of the world and were first reported in North America in 1934 when Archipsocus nomas  became abundant near New Orleans.

Psocids in the genus Archipsocus differ from each other on minute particulars and there is not a single feature that can be used to diagnose all the species. Some characteristics that may be useful include the length of the different segments of the antennae and the shape of the phallic frame.

Taxonomy
Some species that used to be included in this genus and which give birth by parthenogenesis to live young, have now been separated into the genus Archipsocopsis. These include Archipsocopsis frater (Mockford, 1957) and Archipsocopsis parvula (Mockford, 1953).

Some selected species

 Archipsocus badonneli 
 Archipsocus brasilianus (Enderlein) 
 Archipsocus broadheadi (Badonnel) 
 Archipsocus castrii (Badonnel) 
 Archipsocus cervinus 
 Archipsocus corbetae (Smithers, 1964)
 Archipsocus costalima 
 Archipsocus dextor (Enderlein, 1911)
 Archipsocus enderleini 
 Archipsocus floridanus (Mockford, 1953) 
 Archipsocus gibberophallus 
 Archipsocus granulosus (Badonnel)
 Archipsocus gurneyi  (Mockford, 1953)
 Archipsocus indentatus (Mockford)
 Archipsocus lenkoi (Badonnel)
 Archipsocus lineatus 
 Archipsocus minutillus 
 Archipsocus mockfordi 
 Archipsocus modestus 
 Archipsocus newi (Badonnel)
 Archipsocus nomas  (Gurney, 1939)
 Archipsocus panama  (Gurney, 1939)
 Archipsocus pearmani 
 Archipsocus tenebricosus

References

External links
 Life history studies of some Florida insects of the genus Archipsocus  (Psocoptera)

Psocomorpha genera
Archipsocidae